"I'm a Greedy Man" is a song recorded by James Brown in 1971. It was released as a two-part single on Polydor Records, which charted #7 R&B and #35 Pop. The song also appeared on the album There It Is.

References

James Brown songs
Songs written by James Brown
1971 singles